State Road 134 (SR 134) is an , east–west signed state highway located entirely in Jacksonville, Duval County, Florida, in the U.S. state of Florida. It extends from SR 228 to U.S. Route 17 (US 17). It is known as 103rd Street west of Wesconnett Boulevard and Timuquana Road east of the intersection. The road is between four and six lanes wide.

Route description
SR 134 begins at an intersection with Pow-Mia Memorial Parkway at the western end of Cecil Field. It heads east on the north end of the airport until an intersection with SR 23. Just east of Old Middleburg Road, SR 134 crosses the Ortega River for the first time.

Just east of County Road 213 (CR 213) is an interchange with Interstate 295 (I-295; Jacksonville West Beltway), signed as exit 16 on I-295. The road crosses the Ortega River one more time before ending at U.S. Route 17 (US 17; Roosevelt Boulevard) near the St. Johns River.

Major intersections

References

134
134
134
Westside, Jacksonville